Octopus were a British-Flemish band active 1973 to 1980. Formed in Diest in late 1972, the original members were Robert Vlaeyen, Steve Davies, Jean-Pierre Onraedt and Nic Roland.  Robert Vlaeyen came from the group The Bats where Robert's brother, the television producer René Vlaeyen also played, but became Octopus's manager. After a time, Nic Roland left due to session work schedules, and was replaced by a friend of Steve's from England, Phil Francis, a bass player and singer. Jean-Pierre was an in-demand session drummer and had to leave the band shortly afterwards and was replaced by another former 'Bats' member,  Gerard Opdebeeck. The band worked as a 4-piece, but really wanted a fifth voice and a keyboardist. They auditioned quite a few and chose Paul Michiels, who later became popular for his work with the Belgian music group Soulsister.

After two large hits, "I'm So in Love with You" (an English language remake of Paul Severs "Ik ben Verliefd op jou") and "My Special Angel", the band worked regularly in Europe, and toured with other bands such as Mud and the Rubettes.

Steve left the band in 1976, and returned to the UK, where he became a successful cabaret singer known as Steve Grey, and then on to the US, where he played in a number of bands and did extensive session work, but is now a solo act, but travels a lot, notably gigs in The Bahamas, Germany and as far as Vietnam, where he presently lives.  He can be found on video as 'Steve Davies-man of 100 Songs'  Phil Francis left Belgium in the early 1980s and now has a travel business in Toronto, Canada. When not working on his business, he is an active member of the Toronto-based New Choir. Interesting, the members have all remained good friends over the years.

Discography
 "I'm So in Love with You" (1974) (NL#16)
 "My Special Angel" (1975) (NL#18)
 "Summerland" (1976) (NL#21)
 "South of the Border" (1978) (NL#14)

References

British rock music groups
Belgian rock music groups